Labour Inspection (Seafarers) Convention, 1996 is  an International Labour Organization Convention.

It was established in 1996, with the preamble stating:
Recalling the entry into force of the United Nations Convention on the Law of the Sea, 1982, on 16 November 1994, and

Having decided upon the adoption of certain proposals with regard to the revision of the Labour Inspection (Seamen) Recommendation, 1926, ...

Ratifications
As of 2022, 15 states have ratified the convention. However, fourteen of ratifying states have subsequently denounced it.

Marine labour issues on COVID-19 

The strategy of the International Maritime Organization (IMO) and the World Health Organization (WHO) had been coordinated to prevent the spread of COVID-19, the aim of the ILO Memorandum.

Seafarers and shipowners were supported by both the International Chamber of Shipping and the International Transport Workers' Federation.
The International Maritime Chamber has assisted in issuing a 'Coronavirus (COVID-19) Guidance for Ship Operators for the Protection of the Health of Seafarers' while the International Transport Workers’ Federation has issued the 'COVID-19 advice to ships and seafarers.'

According to the 2006 MLC, derogations, exemptions or other clauses are possible. Governments are provided with a flexible interpretation of the convention. Decisions are taken in consultation with shipowners' and seafarers' organizations, taking into account all the factors proposed by the government concerned to the office.

Some external circumstances can make it difficult to implement the obligations laid down in Labour Inspection (Seafarers) Convention, 1996.

External links 
Text.
Ratifications.

References 

International Labour Organization conventions
Treaties concluded in 1996
Treaties entered into force in 2000
Treaties of Albania
Treaties of Brazil
Treaties of Fiji
Treaties of Ireland
Treaties of Nigeria
Treaties of Peru
Treaties of the United Kingdom
Treaties extended to the Isle of Man
Admiralty law treaties
1996 in labor relations